Bancourt is a commune in the Pas-de-Calais department in the Hauts-de-France region in northern France.

Geography
A small farming village located 10 miles (16 km) south of Arras at the junction of the D7 and D7E1 roads.

Population

Sights
 The church of St. Remi, rebuilt, like the village, after 1918.
 The Bancourt British Cemetery.

See also
Communes of the Pas-de-Calais department

References

External links

 CWGC Bancourt cemetery

Communes of Pas-de-Calais